The Antillean mango was formerly a species of hummingbird with two subspecies. As of mid-2022 the former subspecies are treated as species in their own right:

Hispaniolan mango (Anthracothorax dominicus)
Puerto Rican mango (Anthracothorax aurulentus)

References

Bird common names